Blue Hawaii is the fifth studio album by Filipino singer-actress Nora Aunor released in 1971 and her 14th album since 1967.  This album was released by Alpha Records Corporation in the Philippines in LP format and later released in 1999 in a compilation/ cd format.

About the album
Blue Hawaii is one of the highest selling albums by Aunor. The single, "Pearly Shells", sold more than 1 million units, making it one of the biggest selling singles in the Philippine music industry. It was later made into a movie with the same title where Nora Aunor starred opposite Tirso Cruz III.

Track listing

Side one

Side two

Album credits 
Arranged and conducted by Doming Valdez
Recorded at CAI Studios

References

See also
 Nora Aunor discography

1971 albums
Nora Aunor albums